Raid is a Russian crime drama television series created by Olivier Marchal.  It was produced by Cargo Film with the participation of Channel One Russia. It is a Russian adaptation of the French series Braquo. The series was first broadcast in Russia from April 2017.

Plot
The protagonists are four police agents in the Kaliningrad area of Kaliningrad Oblast: Oleg Caplan (Vladimir Mashkov), Pavel Karpenko (Denis Shvedov), Feodor Vachevsky (Aleksandr Pal) and Oxana Golikova (Lukerya Ilyashenko). Their colleague Andrey Ryzhov (Andrey Smolyakov) is accused of criminal misconduct, and commits suicide in the prison. His guilt is then presumed, disrupting the lives of the other four.

The four police agents then decide to "cross the red line": do whatever is necessary, even breaking the law, to clear Ryzhov's name. In crossing the red line, however, they fall under the close scrutiny of Borodin, of the police internal affairs bureau, a sworn enemy to Caplan.

Cast

Production
The series was shot in Kaliningrad.

See also
 Braquo
 List of Russian television series

References

External links

2010s Russian television series
2017 Russian television series debuts
Russian crime television series
Russian workplace drama television series
Russian police procedural television series
Television shows set in Russia
Television shows set in Kaliningrad
Channel One Russia original programming
Fictional portrayals of police departments in Russia